Sadegh Varmazyar  is an Iranian retired football defender who played for Iran national football team and Esteghlal FC. He also played for Iran national futsal team in the 1992 FIFA Futsal World Championship and 1996 FIFA Futsal World Championship.

Honours

National 
FIFA Futsal World Cup
Fourth place: 1
1992

Club 
Asian Champions League
Winner: 1
1990–91 with Esteghlal FC

Runner up: 1
1991–92 with Esteghlal FC

Qods League
Winner: 1
1989–90 with Esteghlal FC

Azadegan League

Runner up: 2
1991–92 with Esteghlal FC
1994–95 with Esteghlal FC

Third Place: 1
1995–96 with Esteghlal FC

Tehran Football League
Winner: 1
1984–85 with Esteghlal FC

Runner up: 1
1989–90 with Esteghlal FC
1990–91 with Esteghlal FC

Third Place: 2
1988–89 with Esteghlal FC
1986–87 with Esteghlal FC

 Iran Hazfi Cup
Winner: 1
1995–96 with Esteghlal FC
Runner up: 1
1990–91 with Esteghlal FC

References

External links
 
 
 Sadegh Varmazyar at TeamMelli.com

1966 births
Living people
People from Malayer
Iranian footballers
Iranian men's futsal players
Iran international footballers
Esteghlal F.C. players
Elmo Adab FSC managers
Iranian futsal coaches
Azadegan League players
Association football defenders
Footballers at the 1994 Asian Games
Asian Games competitors for Iran